The Diocese of Makueni is a diocese within Province of Kenya: it was created from the Anglican Diocese of Machakos in 2013 and the current bishops are The Rt Revd Joseph Mutungi and Francis Mboya Matui.

References

Dioceses of the Anglican Church of Kenya
Anglican dioceses of Mombasa